Bidensovirus is a genus of single stranded DNA viruses that infect invertebrates. The species in this genus were originally classified in the family Parvoviridae (subfamily Densovirinae) but were moved to a new genus because of significant differences in  
the genomes.

Taxonomy
There is one species in this genus currently recognised: Bombyx mori bidensovirus.

Host
As the name suggests this virus infects Bombyx mori, the silkworm.

Virology
The virions are icosahedral, non enveloped and ~25 nanometers in diameter. They contain two structural proteins.

The genome is bipartite, unique among ssDNA viruses, with two linear segments of ~6 and 6.5 kilobases (kb). These segments and the complementary strands are  that are packaged separately giving rise to 4 different types of full particles.

Both segments have an ambisense organization, coding for a structural protein in one sense and the non-structural proteins on the complementary strand.

 DNA1 (aka VD1) — the larger segment of 6.5 kb — encodes the capsid protein VP1 (128 kDa — kiloDaltons) on one strand and three non-structural proteins — NS1 of 14 kDa, NS2 of 37 kDa and NS3 of 55 kDa — on the complementary strand.

 DNA2 (aka VD2) — the smaller segment of 6 kb — encodes the capsid protein VP2 (133 kDa) on one strand and the non-structural protein NS4 (27 kDa) on the complementary strand.

The open reading frame 4 (VD1-ORF4) is 3318 nucleotides (bases) in length and encodes a predicted 1105 amino acid protein which has a conserved DNA polymerase motif. It appears to encode at least 2 other proteins including one of ~53 kDa that forms part of the virion.

Evolution
Comprehensive analysis of bidnavirus genes has shown that these viruses have evolved from a parvovirus ancestor from which they inherit a jelly-roll capsid protein and a superfamily 3 helicase. It has been further suggested that the key event that led to the separation of the bidnaviruses from parvoviruses was the acquisition of the PolB gene. A likely scenario has been proposed under which the ancestral parvovirus genome was integrated into a large virus-derived DNA transposon of the Polinton/Maverick family (polintoviruses)  resulting in the acquisition of the polintovirus PolB gene along with terminal inverted repeats. Bidnavirus genes for a minor structural protein (putative receptor-binding protein) and a potential novel antiviral defense modulator were derived from dsRNA viruses (Reoviridae) and dsDNA viruses (Baculoviridae), respectively.

References

External links
 Bidensovirus ~ ViralZone page. The top image erraneously shows a monopartite genome, text and genome map are right (March 30, 2021).

Single-stranded DNA viruses
Virus genera